Purl or wormwood ale is an English drink.  It was originally made by infusing ale with the tops of various species of Artemisia ("wormwood"), especially those of Artemisia maritima, "sea wormwood", which grows in coastal salt marsh and bears the alternative English common name of "old woman" ("old man" being a common name of the related A. abrotanum).  Other purgative or bitter herbs such as orange peel or senna might also be used.  The drink was commonly drunk in the early hours of the morning at which time it was popular with labourers.

By the middle of the 19th century, wormwood had been forgotten and the recipe was to mull ale instead with gin, sugar and spices such as ginger.  It was sold by purl-men from purl-boats on the Thames who were licensed by the Watermen's Hall.  The drink ceased to be popular by the end of the 19th century, being replaced by beer, especially the variety known to the English as bitter.

Purl-royal was a similar concoction made using wine in place of ale or beer.

The English took the drink with them to North America and a purl house was opened in New York, where rich punches and possets were popular.

In fiction

Shakespeare mentions purl in his play, The Merry Wives of Windsor.  Samuel Pepys recorded in his diary entry for February 19, 1660, "Thence forth to Mr Harper's to drink a draft of purle, whither by appointment Monsieur L'Impertinent".  On March 21, 1662, he writes, "Thence to Westminster Hall ... Here I met with Chetwind, Parry, and several others, and went to a little house behind the Lords' house to drink some wormwood ale, which doubtless was a bawdy house, the mistress of the house having the look and dress". 

Two centuries later, purl appeared in Charles Dickens's The Old Curiosity Shop, published in 1840–1841. The character Dick Swiveller makes a show of kindness by bringing from a public house a boy "who bore in one hand a plate of bread and beef, and in the other a great pot, filled with some very fragrant compound, which sent forth a grateful steam, and was indeed choice purl, made after a particular recipe which Mr Swiveller had imparted to the landlord, at a period when he was deep in his books and desirous to conciliate his friendship." And, in the next chapter: "Mr. Swiveller emerged from the house; and feeling that he had by this time taken quite as much to drink as promised to be good for his constitution (purl being a rather strong and heady compound)...."

Dickens described the final period of the drink in his last novel, Our Mutual Friend:

Recipe
According to The London and Country Brewer, purl was made in the following manner:

See also

 Absinthe
 Vermouth

References

Types of beer
English alcoholic drinks
Historical alcoholic drinks
Fermented drinks